Redwood Castle (also known as Egan Castle or Caislean Choillte Rua in Irish) is a Norman castle near Lorrha in County Tipperary, Ireland.

The castle was built by the Normans around 1200 AD, and was occupied by them until , when the Mac Aodhagáin (MacEgan, Egan, Keegan) were installed on the lands. 

As hereditary Brehons or lawyers, the Mac Aodhagáin clan established a school of learning here, which was patronised by the family for several hundred years.

The castle was enlarged and renovated several times, with considerable work from 1350. Aside from the original thick stone walls, the building demonstrates some architectural features common to Irish fortifications of the period (including a murder-hole), and some less common features (including a Sheela na gig).

The castle remained under continuous occupation and ownership by the (Mac)Egan families until , when it was confiscated and burned at the time of the Cromwellian conquest of Ireland.

The site remained in ruin for over 300 years, with only the thick exterior walls standing, until Michael J. Egan, a Mayo lawyer, purchased and renovated the building in 1972. While the castle remains a private residence, terms of the Department of Finance Heritage/Cultural Tax Relief mean the castle is periodically open to the public during the summer months. It is a protected structure (ref S329) on the North Tipperary list of protected structures.

The castle hosted several "Clan Egan" rallies in 2000, 2004 and 2008.

References

External links
 Redwood Castle - official site
 

Historic house museums in the Republic of Ireland
Museums in County Tipperary
Castles in County Tipperary
Tower houses in the Republic of Ireland